Indira Gandhi Memorial Tulip garden, previously Model Floriculture Center, is a tulip garden in Srinagar, Jammu and Kashmir, India. It is situated at the base of the Zabarwan range, built on a sloping ground in a terraced fashion consisting of seven terraces with an overview of the Dal Lake. The garden was opened in 2007 with the aim to boost floriculture and tourism in the Kashmir Valley. It was formerly known as Siraj Bagh. About 1.5 million tulip bulbs, all in multiple colours, were brought Keukenhof tulip gardens of Amsterdam. Besides tulips, there are 46 varieties of flowers, including hyacinths, daffodils and ranunculus which were also brought from Holland. The tulip garden is home to around 68 varieties of tulips.

Tulip festival 

The Tulip festival is an annual Spring festival to increase tourism by the Government of Jammu and Kashmir. The festival  showcases a variety of flowers in the garden.

Gallery

References

External links
 Tulip season in Kashmir
 Trip Advisory Photo Gallery
 Kashmir Tulip Garden to be thrown open for public on March 19

Gardens in Jammu and Kashmir
2007 establishments in Jammu and Kashmir
Monuments and memorials to Indira Gandhi
Tourist attractions in Srinagar